Terje Svabø (born 4 October 1952) is a Norwegian journalist.

Svabø has worked at Aftenposten, VG and NRK evening news, where he hosted the debate programs Debatt 21 (Debate 21) and Til debatt. In 2000 he left NRK and joined the public relations agency Dinamo. He has also been general manager of the think tank Civita.

Until 2009, he worked as a news anchor at TV 2 Nyhetskanalen. He was for a while a freelance journalist in Vienna, where his wife Astrid Versto worked at the Norwegian embassy.

Publications
 with Bjørn Egil Eide. Smilets revolusjon: Cory Aquinos filippinske revolusjon. Oslo: Cappelen, 1986. 
 with Erling Norvik. Hiv dokker i kalosjan. Oslo: Cappelen, 1990. 
 with Inge Grødum. "Lillyhammer" : OL '94 sett fra utlandet. Oslo: Cappelen, 1994. 
 Tampa. Lysaker: Dinamo, 2002. 
 "Norsk offentlig debatt blottet for helhetstenkning". Opinion article. Aftenposten March 11, 2004. Updated December 9, 2010.

References

1952 births
Living people
Norwegian television presenters
Norwegian television news anchors
NRK people
TV 2 (Norway) people
Norwegian marketing people
Norwegian expatriates in Austria